Saptalingi River is a river in Ratnagiri district of Maharashtra, India. It originates near Harpude, flows near Devrukh and meets Bav River near Musalmanvadi.

References 

Rivers of Maharashtra
Rivers of the Western Ghats
Ratnagiri district